Data ethnography is a type of qualitative research where the purpose is to explore the life of data and how they are incorporated in everyday activities.

Ethnography 
An ethnography is a qualitative research method that involve the observation of discourse and behavior of a community; its aim is to analyze and understand the culture, decision-making, and social dynamics of a group.

It is usually conducted in the form of participant observation over an extended period of time, but it can also include in-depth interviews, as well as hermeneutic reading of documents such as emails, websites, etc.

Defining data ethnography 
There has been a public concern regarding the size data and how it is consumed, especially with the immense spread of technological devices and sensors that produce huge amounts of data about the world, which is then circulated to a variety of users that include people, businesses, and individuals. Furthermore, It becomes necessary to analyse the data, which is a byproduct of human interaction, using qualitative methods such as an ethnography; a data ethnography explores the interchanges within online communities as well as data-mediated interactions. 

It is a means of understanding social worlds within the realm of data consumption, which would involve how users consume data, how they are circulated, and how data shape how people interact and live their lives.

Examples 
Researchers Coletta and Kitchin (2017) conducted a data ethnography where they used extended observation and interviews in a traffic control room in Dublin, and that is to examine the capture, processing, and acting of real-time data that is generated by internet of things technologies.

Tanweer et al. (2016) took advantage of extended observations and in-depth interviews to study the pseudonymous Data Science Collaboration; it involves data science methodology experts being matched with domain researchers to come up with methods that make better sense of datasets.

Lehtiniemi and Ruckenstein (2019) conducted a data ethnography of MyData, which is a Finnish data activism initiative that encourages more user control of personal data; throughout a four-year period, the researchers depended on participant observation in research projects and collaborative activities, and made use of informal discussions, participating in a Facebook discussion group, interviewing stakeholders, as well as organizing and attending events.

References 

Ethnography